Derby Historic District is a national historic district located in Wise County, Virginia. The district encompasses 102 contributing buildings, 1 contributing site, and 1 contributing structure in the coal company town of Derby. The contributing buildings consist of 72 houses, the Derby Methodist Church, a hose house, 5 company garages, 5 outbuildings, and 18 coal houses. Most of the buildings were built in 1923 of hollow ceramic tile.

It was listed on the National Register of Historic Places in 2004.

References

Historic districts in Wise County, Virginia
National Register of Historic Places in Wise County, Virginia
Historic districts on the National Register of Historic Places in Virginia